Aydemir may refer to:

Given name

 Aydemir Güler, Turkish communist politician

Surname
 Esma Aydemir (born 1992), Turkish female middle-distance runner
 İbrahim Aydemir (born 1983), Turkish footballer
 Naz Aydemir (born 1990), Turkish female volleyball player
 Şevket Süreyya Aydemir (1897–1976), Turkish intellectual
 Dragana Lucija Ratković Aydemir, cultural manager

Turkish-language surnames
Turkish masculine given names